Trechinothus is a genus of fungus with unknown status.

The genus was described in 2004 by E.C.Martini and Trichies.

The species of this genus are found in Europe.

Species:
 Trechinothus smardae (Pilát) E.C.Martini & Trichies, 2004

References

Agaricomycetes
Basidiomycota genera